Tommi is a masculine Finnish given name. Traditional Finnish diminutive of “Thomas”. Thomas comes from the Aramaic name Thoma, meaning ‘twin’. Used as a formal given name since 20th century, reinforced by the English Tommy.

Notable people with the name include:

Tommi Eronen (born 1968), Finnish actor
Tommi Evilä (born 1980), Finnish long jumper
Tommi Hakala (born 1970, Finnish baritone, winner of the 2003 BBC Singer of the World Competition
Tommi Hartonen (born 1977), Finnish sprinter
Tommi Hovi (born 1980), former professional Magic: The Gathering player from Finland
Tommi Kautonen (born 1971), Finnish football manager and former player (midfielder)
Tommi Korpela (born 1968), Finnish actor
Tommi Liimatta (born 1976), singer, songwriter and lyricist for the rock group Absoluuttinen Nollapiste
Tommi Läntinen (born 1959), Finnish singer-songwriter
Tommi Mäkinen (born 1964), retired Finnish rally driver
Tommi Miettinen (born 1975), retired Finnish professional ice hockey player
Tommi Salmelainen (born 1949), Finnish hockey left winger
Tommi Santala (born 1979), Finnish ice hockey player
Tommi Sartanen, Finnish guitarist, who plays in the power metal band Twilightning
Tommi Satosaari (born 1975), Finnish professional ice hockey goaltender
Tommi Stumpff (born 1958), former German musician
Tommi Taurula, Finnish actor
Tommi Tomich (born 1980), Australian football (soccer) player
Tommi Vaiho (born 1988), goalkeeper
Tommi Viik (born 1987), Finnish professional football player
Tommi Virtanen (born 1989), Finnish ice hockey goaltender

See also
Tommi (band), British girl group formed in 2003
Tommi puukko, maybe the most famous traditional knife from Finland called Puukko

Finnish masculine given names